Jardine Peak is a peak,  high, standing  southwest of Point Thomas on the west side of Admiralty Bay, King George Island, in the South Shetland Islands. It was named by the UK Antarctic Place-Names Committee in 1960 for D. Jardine of the Falkland Islands Dependencies Survey, a geologist at Admiralty Bay in 1949, who travelled extensively on King George Island.

References

Mountains of King George Island (South Shetland Islands)